This Mandapa is located within the Gosagaresvara siva temple precinct, Old Town, Bhubaneswar. It is a lofty platform (Mandapa) provided with a flight of steps. There are sixteen pillars that support the superstructure of the flat roof. Construction of a Mandapa within a precinct is a feature of Orissan temple ritual and architecture. These Mandapas usually have sixteen pillars which are also noticed in the Hazari Mandapa in Kapilesvara temple precinct, Jalesvara Mandapa in the Jalesvara temple precinct of Kalarahanga and MuktiMandapa in the Jagannatha temple precinct of Puri.

Location
Lat. 20° 14’ 71’’N, Long. 85° 49’ 96’’E, Elev. 67 ft.

Tradition & legends
During Durgastami which is held in the month of September–October, Lord Lingaraja visits Gosagarsvara precinct to cleanse his sins. After the ritual bath the lord pays his homage to lord Gosagaresvara and then comes to this Mandapa for public viewing where he is offered food.

Ownership
Single/Multiple: Multiple

Public/Private: Private

Property Type
Precinct/Building, structure landscope site Tank: Precinct

Subtype: Mandapa

Typology: Pillared Mandapa

Property use
Abandoned/ in use:In use

Present use: Living Mandapa

Past use: Used

Significance
Social significance: The locals and the visitors also take rest.

Physical description

Surrounding: The Mandapa is surrounded by Gosagaresvara temple in west, kitchen in east and Isanesvara temple in south.

Orientation: The Mandapa is provided with a flight of steps in the western side.

Architectural features(Plan & Elevation): On plan, the Mandapa is rectangular measuring 6.70 metres in length x 5.28 metres in breadth with a height of 0.80 metres from the ground level to the base of the pillars. On elevation, the Mandapa has a flat roof that measures 3.40 metres in height from bottom to the top. There are sixteen pillars that support the roof of the 115 Mandapa. The arrangement of the pillars is something unusual with ten pillars in the two exterior rows, five in each row and six pillars at central two rows, three in each row. While all pillars are square the two pillars in the centre are octagonal. A pedestal measuring 1.20 metres in length x 1.65 metres in width x a height of 2.05 metres.; is decorated with makara Torana is meant for lord Siva to seat during his visit to Gosagaresesvara. There are three flights of steps measuring 0.37 metres in length x 1.30 metres in width with a height of 0.30 metres each lead to the Mandapa.

Decorative features: Doorjamb

Building material: Laterite

Construction techniques: Ashlar masonry & cement plaster

State of preservation
Good/Fair/Showing Signs of Deterioration/Advanced: Fair

Grade (A/B/C)
Architecture:B

Historic: C

Associational: B

Social/Cultural: B

Date of Documentation
22 / 12 / 2006

Documentor
Dr. Sadasiba Pradhan & team

References

Lesser Known Monuments of Bhubaneswar by Dr. Sadasiba Pradhan

External links
 http://www.ignca.nic.in/asi_reports/orkhurda227.pdf
 http://www.evri.com/location/gosagarsevara-mandapa-0x5c4a83
 http://www.blogscope.net/tools/wikipedia/?w=Wikipedia:WikiProject 
 http://www.territorioscuola.com/wikipedia/en.wikipedia.php?title 
 http://www.ignca.nic.in/asi_reports/orkhurda227.pdf
 http://www.digparty.com/wiki/Gosagarsevara_Mandapa
 http://www.kvitters.com/search/mandapa
 http://www.evri.com/location/gosagarsevara-mandapa-0x5c4a83
 http://www.blogscope.net/tools/wikipedia/?w=Wikipedia:WikiProject_India/New_articles 

Hindu temples in Bhubaneswar